The blue mussel (Mytilus edulis), also known as the common mussel, is a medium-sized edible marine bivalve mollusc in the family Mytilidae, the mussels. Blue mussels are subject to commercial use and intensive aquaculture. A species with a large range, empty shells are commonly found on beaches around the world.

Systematics and distribution

The Mytilus edulis complex
Systematically blue mussel consists of a group of (at least) three closely related taxa of mussels, known as the Mytilus edulis complex.  Collectively they occupy both coasts of the North Atlantic (including the Mediterranean) and of the North Pacific in temperate to polar waters, as well as coasts of similar nature in the Southern Hemisphere.  The distribution of the component taxa has been recently modified as a result of human activity.  The taxa can hybridise with each other, if present at the same locality.

Mytilus edulis sensu stricto: Native to the North Atlantic.
Mytilus galloprovincialis, the Mediterranean mussel: Native in the Mediterranean, the Black Sea and Western Europe. Introduced in the temperate North Pacific, South Africa and elsewhere in the Southern Hemisphere. 
Mytilus planulatus, the New Zealand blue mussel, a distinct lineage native to the Southern Hemisphere along the southern coast of Australia, Tasmania and New Zealand 
Mytilus platensis (junior synonym M. chilensis), the Chilean mussel: Temperate and sub-Antarctic waters of South America and the Kerguelen Islands.
Mytilus trossulus: North Pacific, northern parts of the North Atlantic, Baltic Sea.

Mytilus edulis, strict sense
The Atlantic blue mussel is native on the North American Atlantic coast, but is found intermixed with M. trossulus north of Maine. In Atlantic Canada, M. trossulus was found to have smaller shell growth values than M. edulis and contain less meat than M. edulis. Keeping this in mind, M. edulis, under raft culture conditions, is estimated to have an economic value of 1.7 times M. trossulus. In Europe it is found from French Atlantic coast northwards to Novaya Zemlya and Iceland, but not in the Baltic Sea. In France and in the British Isles, it makes hybrid zones with M. galloprovincialis, and also is sometimes intermixed with M. trossulus.

The genetically distinct lineage of M. edulis present in the Southern Hemisphere has been attributed to subspecies Mytilus edulis platensis (now Mytilus platensis).

Habitat

Blue mussels are boreo-temperate invertebrates that live in intertidal areas attached to rocks and other hard substrates by strong (and somewhat elastic) thread-like structures called byssal threads, secreted by byssal glands located in the foot of the mussel.

Description
The shape of the shell is triangular and elongated with rounded edges. The shell is smooth with a sculpturing of fine concentric growth lines but no radiating ribs. The shells of this species are purple, blue or sometimes brown in color, occasionally with radial stripes. The outer surface of the shell is covered by the periostracum which as eroded, exposes the colored prismatic calcitic layer. Blue Mussels are semi-sessile, having the ability to detach and reattach to a surface allowing the mollusk to reposition itself relative to the water position.

<div align=center>
Right and left valve of the same specimen:

var. flavida

</div align=center>

Reproduction
Mussels have separate sexes. Once the sperm and eggs are fully developed they are released into the water column for fertilization. Although there are about 10,000 sperm per egg, large proportions of eggs deposited by blue mussels are never fertilized. As few as 1% of larvae that do mature ever reach adulthood.  The majority are eaten by predators before completing metamorphosis.

The reproductive strategy seen in blue mussels is characteristic of planktotrophs.  By minimizing nutrients in egg production to the bare minimum they are able to maximize the number of gametes produced. If the adult mussels are stressed during the beginning of gametogenesis, the process is terminated. When stressed while fresh gametes are present, adult mussels reabsorb gametes. Larvae viability is also affected by the condition of parents: high water temperatures, pollutants and scarcity of food, during gamete production. The reduction in viability is probably due to the lack of lipid reserves distributed to the eggs.

Larval development
Larval development can last from 15 to 35 days depending environmental conditions including salinity and temperature, as well as location.

The first stage of development is the ciliated embryo, which in 24-hours for fertilization form the trochophore. At this point although mobile, it is still reliant on the yolk for nutrients. Characterized by a functional mouth and alimentary canal the veliger stage also has cilia which are used for filtering food as well as propulsion. A thin translucent shell is secreted by the shell gland forming the notable straight hinge of the prodissoconch I shell. The veliger continues to mature forming the prodissoconch II shell. In the end stage of veliger development photosensitive eye spots and elongated foot with a byssal gland are formed.

Once the pediveliger is fully developed, its foot extends and makes contact with substrate. The initial contact with the substrate is loose. If the substrate is suitable, the larva will metamorphoses into the juvenile form, plantigrade, and attach byssus threads. The mussel will remain in that state until reaching 1-1.5mm in length. This attachment is the prerequisite for the foundation for the blue mussel population.  In sheltered environments large masses sometimes form beds which offer shelter and food for other invertebrates. Byssal thread are secreted by byssal glands located in the foot of the mussel, and are made up of polyphenolic proteins which serve as a bioadhesive.

Aggregation and mussel bed formation

Blue mussels often form aggregations, where they attach to each other using byssus threads. These are collagenous protein strands used for attachment. The type of aggregation depends on population densities. When densities are low, for example in mussel fields – short-lived mussel populations – clumped distribution patterns are seen. The rate of aggregation is aided by the presence of predator cues.

Several explanations for aggregate formation have been offered, such as increase of reproductive success in low density populations, resisting of wave action, and defence against predators. It is, however, still unclear what the main purpose is and aggregation might have different purposes under different circumstances.

Mussel beds are persistent, dense mussel populations. Beds generally form from fields that persist long enough to establish a dense population. In high density aggregations, growth of blue mussels at the centre of the aggregation is reduced, likely due to a reduction in food availability. When possible, mussels will thus migrate to lower densities on larger scales (>7.5 cm), but aggregate on small scales (<2.0 cm). In areas where blue mussels are threatened, such as the Wadden Sea, it is of great importance to enhance the survival of mussel fields, of which mussel aggregates are the primary component.

Predators
Predation of blue mussels is greatest during the three weeks it spends as a planktonic larva. During this stage it is susceptible to jellyfish and fish larvae through adults. Once it metamorphoses the mussel is still restricted by predation, with smaller mussels with thinner, weaker shells most affected.  Once the shells becomes stronger, blue mussels are preyed upon by sea stars such as  Asterias vulgaris as well as by several species of sea gulls. The capability of shell thickening by mussels has become a very effective defense mechanism. In the presence of predators a mussel is able to increase shell thickness 5 to 10 percent, which in turn makes opening the shell take 50 percent more time. Small mussels are also eaten by the dog whelk, Nucella lapillus. The blue mussel is host to a wide range of parasites, but these parasites usually do not cause much damage. 
Blue Mussels are able to fight off one species of predator at a time such as sea star (Asterias rubens (=Asterias vulgaris)) or green crabs (Carcinus maenas). They use their inducible defenses to strengthen their adductor muscle or grow thicker shells. When faced with two species at a time, they are no longer able to use their defenses and can be killed more easily.

Uses and ecosystem services

Blue mussels are filter feeders and play a vital role in estuaries by removing bacteria and toxins.
Mytilus edulis is commonly harvested for food throughout the world, from both wild and farmed sources. Mussels are a staple of many seafood dishes in various cuisines including Spanish (especially Galician), Portuguese, French, Dutch, Belgian, Italian and Turkey as midye dolma. They are also commonly used as lab animals. Blue mussels were also harvested by the indigenous peoples of North America.

Blue mussels are starting to decline in areas such as the Gulf of Maine. Historical references have shown a decrease of about 40 percent in the last fifty years. This can cause a future problem because mussels are foundation species providing homes and protecting other small animals in the intertidal zone like small fish as well as filtering the water. Mussels filter out bacteria, metals, and toxins, that would increase significantly without mussels around. Ocean acidification due to increasing atmospheric carbon dioxide is projected to reduce the growth and survival of blue mussels; in turn, this could drastically reduce their positive impact on coastal water quality.

Gallery

References

External links
The blue mussel in Maine Maine Department of Marine Resources
Newell, R.I.E. (1989). Species profiles: life histories and environmental requirements of coastal fishes and invertebrates (North and Mid-Atlantic) - blue mussel. U.S. Fish. Wildl. Serv. Biol. Rep. 82(11. 102 ). U.S. Army Corps of Engineers, TR El-82-4. 25 pp.
The common mussel Mytilus edulis MarLIN - The Marine Life Information Network
Robert Nordsieck: The Blue or Common Mussel (Mytilus edulis) The Living World of Molluscs www.molluscs.at
 

Mytilus (bivalve)
Commercial molluscs
Bivalves described in 1758
Taxa named by Carl Linnaeus
Molluscs of the Atlantic Ocean
Fauna of the North Sea
Seafood in Native American cuisine
Marine molluscs of Europe
Bivalves of Europe
Bivalves of North America